() is a municipality and village in Frýdek-Místek District in the Moravian-Silesian Region of the Czech Republic. It has about 800 inhabitants. Former Prime Minister of Poland and former president of the European Parliament Jerzy Buzek was born here.

Polish minority makes up 18.0% of the population.

Etymology
The village was named after František Smyl, who brought new inhabitants here.

Geography
Smilovice lies in the historical region of Cieszyn Silesia. The municipality is located mostly in the Moravian-Silesian Foothills, the southwestern part extends into the Moravian-Silesian Beskids. The Ropičanka stream flows through the municipality.

History
The first written mention of Smilovice is from 1448. It belonged then to the Duchy of Teschen. František Smyl helped to settle the village and brought mainly Romanian Vlachs. For these services, Smyl was promoted to squire and became mayor of Cieszyn. The settlers subsisted on agriculture, pastoralism and mountain farming. In 1603, Adam Wenceslaus, Duke of Cieszyn sold Smilovice to Hanibal of Brno. Then the village often changed owners. In 1644, the territory where the Řeka community was founded separated from Smilovice.

After Revolutions of 1848 in the Austrian Empire a modern municipal division was introduced in the re-established Austrian Silesia. The village as a municipality was subscribed to the political and legal district of Cieszyn. According to the censuses conducted in 1880–1910 the population of the municipality dropped from 684 in 1880 to 651 in 1910 with a majority being native Polish-speakers (dropping from 99% in 1880 to 96% in 1910) accompanied by a small Czech-speaking minority (at most 15 or 2.3% in 1910) and German-speaking (at most 11 or 1.7% in 1910). In terms of religion in 1910 the majority were Protestants (83.5%), followed by Roman Catholics (14.4%), Jews (9 or 1.4%) and 4 people adhering to another faiths.

After World War I, Polish–Czechoslovak War and the division of Cieszyn Silesia in 1920, it became a part of Czechoslovakia. Following the Munich Agreement, in October 1938 together with the Zaolzie region it was annexed by Poland, administratively adjoined to Cieszyn County of Silesian Voivodeship. It was then annexed by Nazi Germany at the beginning of World War II. After the war it was restored to Czechoslovakia.

From 1980 to 1990, Smilovice was an administrative part of Hnojník. Since 1990, it has been a separate municipality.

Culture
The Christian festival XcamP takes place in Smilovice annually in July since 2001.

Notable people
Karol Grycz-Śmiłowski (1885–1959), Polish Lutheran and Unitarian priest
Jerzy Buzek (born 1940), Polish politician, former Prime Minister of Poland
Stanislav Piętak (born 1946), Lutheran bishop

References

External links

 

Villages in Frýdek-Místek District
Cieszyn Silesia